Gemmula tuckeri is an extinct species of sea snail, a marine gastropod mollusk in the family Turridae, the turrids.

Description

Distribution
Fossils of this marine species have been found in Eocene strata in Cotentin, France.

References
Notes

Bibliography
 Tracey S., Craig B. & Gain O. (2019). Turridae (Gastropoda, Conoidea) from the late Lutetian Eocene of the Cotentin, NW France: endemism through loss of planktotrophy?. Carnets de Voyages Paléontologiques dans le Bassin Anglo-Parisien. 5: 101-140

tuckeri
Gastropods described in 2019